Wienbeck is a small river in Osterholz-Scharmbeck, Lower Saxony, Germany. It flows into the Scharmbecker Bach.

See also
List of rivers of Lower Saxony

Rivers of Lower Saxony
Rivers of Germany